Cyclopentadienyl allyl palladium is an organopalladium compound with formula (C5H5)Pd(C3H5). This reddish solid is volatile with an unpleasant odor. It is soluble in common organic solvents.  The molecule consists of a Pd centre sandwiched between a Cp and allyl ligands.

Preparation
This complex is produced by the reaction of allylpalladium chloride dimer with sodium cyclopentadienide:
2 C5H5Na + (C3H5)2Pd2Cl2 → 2 (C5H4)Pd(C3H5) + 2 NaCl

Structure and reactions
The 18-electron complex adopts a half-sandwich structure with Cs symmetry, i.e., the molecule has a plane of symmetry. The complex can be decomposed readily by reductive elimination. 
C3H5PdC3H5 → Pd(0) + C5H5C3H5
The compound readily reacts with alkyl isocyanides to produce clusters with the approximate formula [Pd(CNR)2]n. It reacts with bulky alkyl phosphines to produce two-coordinated palladium(0) complexes:
 
CpPd(allyl) + 2 PR3 → Pd(PR3)2 + C5H5C3H5

The compound has been used to deposit thin film chemical vapor deposition of metallic palladium.

References

Cyclopentadienyl complexes
Organopalladium compounds
Allyl complexes